Réka Gyurátz (born 31 May 1996) is a Hungarian athlete specialising in the hammer throw. She competed at the 2015 World Championships in Beijing without qualifying for the final. In addition she won the gold medal at the 2013 World Youth Championships and the silver at the 2014 World Junior Championships. She also sometimes competes in the discus throw.
 
Her personal best in the hammer is 72.70 metres set in Budapest in 2019.

Competition record

References

Hungarian female hammer throwers
Living people
Place of birth missing (living people)
1996 births
World Athletics Championships athletes for Hungary
Hungarian Athletics Championships winners
Competitors at the 2017 Summer Universiade
Competitors at the 2019 Summer Universiade
Olympic athletes of Hungary
Athletes (track and field) at the 2020 Summer Olympics
Sportspeople from Szombathely
21st-century Hungarian women